Sergey Stanislavovich Kirmasov (born 25 March 1970 in Mtsensk, Oryol) is a retired male hammer thrower from Russia. His personal best is 82.62 metres, achieved in May 1998 in Bryansk.

International competitions

References

sports-reference

1970 births
Living people
People from Mtsensk
Sportspeople from Oryol Oblast
Russian male hammer throwers
Soviet male hammer throwers
Olympic male hammer throwers
Olympic athletes of Russia
Athletes (track and field) at the 2004 Summer Olympics
World Athletics Championships athletes for Russia
Russian Athletics Championships winners